The 1982 NBA All-Star Game was an exhibition basketball game that was played on January 31, 1982, at Brendan Byrne Arena in East Rutherford, New Jersey. This was the 32nd edition of the National Basketball Association  All-Star Game and was played during the 1981–82 NBA season.  The coaches were Bill Fitch for the East, and Pat Riley for the West.  Larry Bird was named the game's MVP for his 4th quarter heroics during crunch time.

Western Conference

Eastern Conference

Score by Periods
 

Halftime— East, 63-61
Third Quarter— East, 90-89
Attendance: 20,149.

References 

National Basketball Association All-Star Game
All-Star
1982 in sports in New Jersey
January 1982 sports events in the United States
Sports competitions in East Rutherford, New Jersey